The Uncomfortable Camera is Northstar's DVD release.  The video contains a live set performed at The Downtown in Long Island, New York, along with the entirety of the band's music video collection and documentary-esque commentary.

Set list
 "Broken Parachute"
 "The Pornographers Daughter"
 "My Ricochet"
 "The Accident Underwater"
 "Rigged & Ready"
 "Two Zero Two"
 "American Living"
 "Like A.M. Radio"
 "Is This Thing Loaded?"
 "Pollyanna"
 "For Members Only"

Bonus features
In addition, the DVD contains music videos for the following songs:

 "Rigged and Ready"
 "For Members Only"
 "Pollyanna"

The DVD also contains acoustic versions of "Train Hopping in Dixieland" and "Taker Not a Giver" from Northstar's debut release, Is This Thing Loaded?.

Northstar (band) albums
2005 films
2000s English-language films